Stefano Oldani (born 10 January 1998) is an Italian cyclist, who currently rides for UCI ProTeam . In October 2020, he was named in the startlist for the 2020 Giro d'Italia.

Major results

2015
 2nd Trofeo Comune di Vertova
 3rd GP Dell'Arno
2016
 1st  Time trial, Junior National Road Championships
 Grand Prix Rüebliland
1st  Points classification
1st Stage 4
 4th Trofeo Citta di Loano
 9th Trofeo Buffoni
2017
 6th GP Capodarco
2018
 5th Trofeo Piva
2019
 5th Overall Istrian Spring Trophy
 7th Overall Tour de Hongrie
 7th Poreč Trophy
2021
 2nd Vuelta a Castilla y León
 10th Gran Piemonte
2022
 1st Stage 12 Giro d'Italia
 2nd Volta Limburg Classic
 3rd Coppa Bernocchi
 4th Grand Prix de Fourmies
 4th Veneto Classic
 8th Overall Danmark Rundt
 8th La Drôme Classic
 10th Coppa Agostoni

Grand Tour general classification results timeline

References

External links

1998 births
Living people
Italian male cyclists
Cyclists from Milan
Italian Giro d'Italia stage winners
21st-century Italian people